Katjuša Pušnik (born 31 January 1969, in Črna na Koroškem) is a Slovenian former alpine skier who competed in the 1992 Winter Olympics.

World Cup results

Season standings

Race podiums

External links
 sports-reference.com

1969 births
Living people
Slovenian female alpine skiers
Olympic alpine skiers of Slovenia
Alpine skiers at the 1992 Winter Olympics
People from the Municipality of Črna na Koroškem